Ouday Raad (11 June 1966) is a Lebanese actor and voice actor.

Filmography

Film 
33 Days. 2013
Tuff Incident (sound direction). 2007

Television 
Ain El Jawza. 2015
Darb Al-Yasamin. 2015
Sanaoud Baad Kalil. 2013
Al Ghaliboun. 2011-2012
Between Love and Dust. 2009

Dubbing roles 
Doctor Who
The Men of Angelos
M.I. High - Frank London, Lenny Bicknall
Mokhtarnameh - Ubayd Allah ibn Ziyad

References

External links 

1966 births
Living people
Lebanese male actors
Lebanese male film actors
Lebanese male television actors
Lebanese male voice actors